Alexandre Pierre Joseph Doche (Paris, 1799 – Saint Petersburg, 31 July 1849 was a French violinist and composer, conductor at the Théâtre du Vaudeville from 1828 to 1848.

The son of Joseph-Denis Doche, he studied at the Conservatoire de Paris and succeeded his father as composer and conductor at the Théâtre du Vaudeville.

In January 1839, he married th Belgian actress Marie-Charlotte-Eugénie de Plunkett. In 1848 he appeared at the theatre of Saint-Petersburg but suddenly died of cholera in 1849.

Works

Theatre 
1838: A trente ans, ou une femme raisonnable, comedy in 3 acts mingled with couplets, with Joseph-Bernard Rosier
1840: Bonaventure, comédie-vaudeville in 3 acts and 4 tableaux, with Frédéric de Courcy and Charles Dupeuty
1841: La Journée d'une jolie femme, vaudeville, lyrics by Adolphe d'Ennery and Eugène Cormon
1843: L'Extase, comedy in 3 acts, mingled with song, with Auguste Arnould and Lockroy
1844: La Polka, vaudeville, with Alexis Decomberousse and Éléonore Tenaille de Vaulabelle

Songs and compositions 
1842: L'Enlèvement des Sabines, quadrille for piano
1842: La Journée d'une jolie femme, grande valse brillante, arranged for piano
1843: Couplets de la mouche, in Album de chant du Monde musical
1844: L'Ame du prieur, ballade, lyrics by Bérardi
1844: Chantez, dansez, aimez, chansonnette, lyrics by Bérardi
1844: Chien et chat, chansonnette, lyrics by Bérardi
1844: La Confession, romance, lyrics by Bérardi
1844: Que t'ai-je fait ?, romance, lyrics by Bérardi
1844: Satan ou le Diable à Paris, quadrille brilliant
1847: Régaillette, complets chantés dans Le Chevalier d'Essonne, lyrics by Auguste Anicet-Bourgeois
1850: Le regard Mélodie, lyrics by Louise Schiltz
1851: Le Carnaval à l'assemblée nationale, lyrics by Gustave Nadaud
1852: La Lorette de la veille, melody without accent, lyrics by Gustave Nadaud
undated: La Muse comique, collective collection of ditties, songs, bawdy, pastoral, roundels, comic scenes, drinking songs and light songs with and without talking, for piano and voice, lyrics by Pierre-Antoine-Augustin de Piis, (with Étienne Arnaud, Amédée de Beauplan, François-Auguste Gevaert, Aristide Hignard, Paul de Kock, Adrien Lagard, Charles Lecocq, Sylvain Mangeant, Charles Pourny, Loïsa Puget, Victor Robillard, Jean-Pierre Solié and Alphonse Thys
undated: Les Formats, rondeau, lyrics by A. Faillot
undated: Poèmes et chansons d'Eugène de Pradel relatifs à Bruxelles
undated: Je pense à toi, romance, lyrics by P. Sain
undated: Valse du mari par interim by Fulgence de Bury, (for piano or harp)

Bibliography 
 François-Joseph Fétis, Biographie universelle des musiciens, 1837, p. 319 
 Eugène de Montalembert, Claude Abromont, Guide des genres de la musique occidentale, 2010

External links 
 Alexandre Pierre Joseph Doche on data.bnf.fr

French conductors (music)
French male conductors (music)
French composers
1799 births
Musicians from Paris
1849 deaths
Deaths from cholera
19th-century French male musicians